Tishkovo is a rural locality (a selo) and the administrative center of Tishkovsky Selsoviet of Volodarsky District, Astrakhan Oblast, Russia. The population was 1,638 as of 2010. There are 15 streets.

Geography 
Tishkovo is located 10 km south of Volodarsky (the district's administrative centre) by road. Grushevo is the nearest rural locality.

References 

Rural localities in Volodarsky District, Astrakhan Oblast